Harry L. Harris (January 23, 1927 – May 23, 2013) was an American politician. He served as a Republican member of the Wyoming House of Representatives.

Life and career 
Harris was born in Evanston, Wyoming, the son of Rose Crompton and Martin F. Harris. He attended Evanston High School and the University of Wyoming.

In 1973, Harris was elected to the Wyoming House of Representatives, representing Uinta County, Wyoming, serving until 1974. From 1990 to 1996, he was a trustee at the University of Wyoming.

Harris died in May 2013 in Mesa, Arizona, at the age of 86.

References 

1927 births
2013 deaths
People from Evanston, Wyoming
Republican Party members of the Wyoming House of Representatives
20th-century American politicians
University of Wyoming alumni